This is a list of the most-produced aircraft types whose numbers exceed or exceeded 5,000. Any and all types of aircraft qualify, including airplanes, airships, balloons, gliders (sailplanes), helicopters, etc.

Most-produced aircraft
Notes 
Each aircraft listed is a piston-engined monoplane unless otherwise described. 
"C" indicates civilian use; "M" indicates military use. Only one is used, according to original designed purpose of the aircraft, or "best deduction".
Role is generally either the original designed role of the aircraft or a "best deduction" based on what role dominated production, disregarding minor variants. Aircraft may be categorized as "Multirole" if no particular role was dominant.
Nation column indicates only the original designer / producer nation. 
Production period column shows overall production date span of all types included in "Numbers produced" column, disregarding production hiatuses and changes in manufacturer, while including close variants and licensed production.

Notes

References

External links 
 Aircraft production runs

Lists of aircraft
Transport-related lists of superlatives